Grgurević is a Serbo-Croatian surname, a patronymic derived from Grgur. It may refer to:

Ivan Grgurević (born 1981), Assistant Professor and Vice Dean for Academic and Student Affairs at University of Zagreb, Faculty of Transport and Traffic Sciences, Zagreb, Croatia
Ante Grgurević (born 1975), Croatian basketballer
Vuk Grgurević (1440–1485), titular Despot of Serbia
Vukašin Grgurević, Bosnian nobleman

Serbian surnames
Croatian surnames
Patronymic surnames
Surnames from given names